Simonswald (Low Alemannic: Simeschwald) is a town in the district of Emmendingen in Baden-Württemberg in Germany.

Twin towns
 Worthing, United Kingdom

References

Emmendingen (district)